In Tune is a 1914 American silent short drama film directed by Henry Otto starring Charlotte Burton, Ed Coxen, George Field, and Winifred Greenwood.

Plot
Well-known novelist Edward Stanley is defrauded by his bookkeeper, and is forced to sell his home to recoup his losses. His frivolous wife Bella, who shows no interested in his writing, leaves him but is subsequently killed in a fire. Ida, Stanley's stenographer, traces forged documents back to the bookkeeper, saving Stanley's fortune. Stanley begins work on a new novel, entitled In Tune, based on the recent events, and marries Ida.

Cast
Edward Coxen (as Ed Coxen) as Tom Stanley
Winifred Greenwood as Ida Drew
Charlotte Burton as Mrs. Tom Stanley
George Field as Robert Long
John Steppling as Ed Mason
William Bertram as Mr. White
King Clark as Mr. Dunn

References

External links

1914 films
1914 drama films
Silent American drama films
American silent short films
American black-and-white films
Films directed by Henry Otto
1914 short films
1910s American films